Donagh Maher (born 28 July 1988) is an Irish hurler who plays for Tipperary Senior Championship club Burgess and previously at inter-county level for the Tipperary senior hurling team. 

On 22 October 2019, Maher announced his retirement from inter-county hurling.

Career Statistics

Honours

Tipperary
All-Ireland Senior Hurling Championship (2): 2016, 2019
Munster Senior Hurling Championship (2): 2012, 2016
Waterford Crystal Cup (1): 2012
All-Ireland Minor Hurling Championship (1): 2006

References

External links

Donagh Maher profile at the Tipperary GAA website

1988 births
Living people
Burgess hurlers
Tipperary inter-county hurlers
Hurling backs
All-Ireland Senior Hurling Championship winners
Alumni of Galway-Mayo Institute of Technology